Cormocephalus laevipes is a species of centipede in the Scolopendridae family. It was first described in 1891 by British zoologist Reginald Innes Pocock.

Distribution
The species is found on Australia’s Lord Howe Island in the Tasman Sea, and in the Solomon Islands.

Behaviour
The centipedes are solitary terrestrial predators that inhabit plant litter, soil and rotting wood.

References

 

 
laevipes
Centipedes of Australia
Fauna of Lord Howe Island
Fauna of the Solomon Islands
Animals described in 1891
Taxa named by R. I. Pocock